On the Beat may refer to:

Films 
On the Beat (1962 film), directed by Robert Asher
On the Beat (1995 film), directed by Ning Ying
On the Beat (2011 film), also known as Sur le rythme, directed by Charles-Olivier Michaud

Music 
On the Beat!, a 2007 album by The KBC
"On the Beat" (song), 1940 record by George Formby, Jr.
"On the Beat", 1981 single by B. B. & Q. Band from their self-titled album

Television 
On the Beat (game show), an American game show that premiered in 2001

See also 
 Beat (disambiguation)